Huang Wanli (20 August 1911 − 27 August 2001) was a Chinese hydrologist. Huang was a professor at Tsinghua University from 1953 to 2001.

Biography
Huang was born in Chuansha County, Jiangsu (now Pudong, Shanghai) on 20 August 1911, the fourth of nine children of Huang Yanpei and Wang Jiusi. In 1924, he enrolled in Wuxi Industrial School. He entered Tangshan Jiaotong University (now Southwest Jiaotong University) in 1927 and graduated in 1932. After college, he worked as an apprentice engineer at Hangzhou-Zhejiang Railway. In 1934, Huang went to the United States. He received a master's degree from Cornell University in hydrology in 1935 and a doctor of engineering degree from University of Illinois in 1937.

In 1945, Huang became an engineer in China's Ministry of Water Resources. He was the chief engineer and head of the Gansu Water Conservancy Bureau from 1947 till April 1949. He was an adviser of Northeast China Water Conservancy Administration in September 1949. He taught at Tangshan Jiaotong University starting in June 1950, and he was transferred to Tsinghua University in 1953.

In 1957, Huang was labeled a "Rightist" and persecuted by Mao Zedong for his criticism of the Sanmenxia Dam on the Yellow River. Then he was sent to the Poyang Lake, Jiangxi to do hard labor, and was transferred back to Tsinghua University in 1974. During Cultural Revolution, the students of Tsinghua University paraded him and other "reactionary figures" through the streets and beat them in public. Huang was exonerated by the Tsinghua University Communist Party Committee on February 26, 1980.

On August 27, 2001, Huang died on the campus of Tsinghua University.He was buried on April 5, 2021 with his wife, Ding Yujun, at Fenghuangshan Cemetery, Area 10 Row 8 number 12, Changping District, Beijing, China

Personal life
Huang was married to Ding Yujun, daughter of Ding Weifen, a founding father of Kuomintang. They had six children:

 Daughter Huang Qieyuan
 Son Huang Guanhong
 Daughter Huang Wuman
 Son Huang Ertao
 Son Huang Luchun
 Daughter Huang Xiaolu

References

External links
江河无情人有情——中国著名水利学家黄万里教授生平 黄且圆 
江河万里——记水利专家黄万里 曾昭奋 
花丛小语 黄万里 
三门峡工程争辩史料 
黄万里教授抱憾辞世，中国再无人反对三峡工程 戴晴 
我所知道的张光斗和黄万里 
三门峡：大坝下的回忆 
黄万里为其老师罗忠忱教授所撰祭文 
无人为三峡工程错误决策承担责任王维洛 

1911 births
2001 deaths
Chinese hydrologists
Cornell University College of Engineering alumni
Educators from Shanghai
Engineers from Shanghai
Scientists from Shanghai
Southwest Jiaotong University alumni
Academic staff of Tsinghua University
Grainger College of Engineering alumni